Party of the Alliance of Youth, Workers and Farmers of Angola (Pajoca, abbreviation of Partido da Aliança Juventude, Operários e Camponeses de Angola) was an opposition party in Angola. The president of Pajoca was Alexandre Sebastião André and the general secretary was Jesus Kabanga. The party was founded in Luanda, on January 19, 1991. The party was founded by disillusioned MPLA cadres.

Pajoca favoured far-reaching autonomy for the Cabinda enclave.

In the run-up for the 1992 elections, Pajoca was registered with the authorities - having presented 3,998 signatures out of which 2,372 were deemed valid (coming from ten provinces, with more than 100 signature from each province).In the 1992 elections Pajoca received 13,924 votes (0.35%) and got one MP elected, Alexandre Sebastião André. In the presidential election, PAJOCA supported the People's Movement for the Liberation of Angola (MPLA) candidate.

In 1998 there was internal turmoil in Pajoca, with then president Sebastião Miguel Tetembwa expelling Alexandre Sebastião André. The first party congress was convened, which elected Alexandre Sebastião André as the new president. The congress also approved a new party constitution.

The women's organization of Pajoca is known as Organização da mulher do Pajoca - OMI-PA.

References

External links
Alexandre Sebastião André

Political parties in Angola
Political parties established in 1991
1991 establishments in Angola